State Road 392 (NM 392) is a  state highway in the US state of New Mexico. NM 392's western terminus is at NM 469 west of Porter, and the eastern terminus is at Interstate 40 (I-40) and NM 93 north of Endee.

Major intersections

See also

References

392
Transportation in Quay County, New Mexico